The Colombian grebe (Podiceps andinus), was a grebe found in the Bogotá wetlands on the Bogotá savanna in the Eastern Ranges of the Andes of Colombia. The species was still abundant in Lake Tota in 1945. The species has occasionally been considered a subspecies of black-necked grebe (P. nigricollis). It was flightless.

The decline of the Colombian grebe is attributed to wetland drainage, siltation, pesticide pollution, disruption by reed harvesting, hunting, competition, and predation of chicks by rainbow trout (Oncorhynchus mykiss). The primary reason was loss of habitat: drainage of wetlands and siltation resulted in higher concentrations of pollutants, causing eutrophication across Lake Tota. This destroyed the open, submergent pondweed (Potamogeton) vegetation and resulted in the formation of a dense monoculture of water weed (Elodea).

By 1968, the species had declined to approximately 300 birds. Only two records of this bird were made in the 1970s; one seen 1972, and the last confirmed record from 1977 when three birds were seen. Intensive studies in 1981 and 1982 failed to find the species and it is now considered extinct.

References

External links 

 BirdLife Species Factsheet

Podiceps
Podicipedidae
Bird extinctions since 1500
Birds described in 1959
Taxa named by Rodolphe Meyer de Schauensee
Extinct birds of South America
Altiplano Cundiboyacense
Species made extinct by human activities